KentuckySkies was a subsidiary of Pacific Wings founded in 2009. The carrier was offered to fly to the destinations stated below on an Essential Air Service contract. Also travelers can connect to sister carrier Georgia Skies at Hartsfield-Jackson Atlanta International Airport. On June 30, 2011, Pacific Wings filed with the United States Department of Transportation a 90-day notice of its intent to terminate service effective September 30, 2011 saying it is "unable to procure counter or gate space at Nashville International Airport on reasonable terms." The DOT prohibited the airline from suspending service until a replacement carrier began service. Eventually a replacement carrier was procured in Cape Air and KentuckySkies ceased operation in early 2012.

Former destinations

Tennessee
Jackson
Nashville

Kentucky
Owensboro

Georgia
Atlanta

Fleet
Cessna 208B Grand Caravan.

See also 
 List of defunct airlines of the United States

References

External links
KentuckySkies

Airlines established in 2009
Airlines disestablished in 2012
Defunct airlines of the United States
American companies established in 2009